The Virgin may refer to:

Religion 

Mary (mother of Jesus)
Margaret the Virgin
Virgo (constellation)
Virgo (astrology)

In media 

"The Virgin" (Seinfeld), television episode
Jane the Virgin, a television series from 2014 to 2019
The Virgin (film), a 1924 silent film by Alan James
The Virgins (film), a 2016 film by Sandeep A. Varma
The Virgin Suicides, a novel by Jeffrey Eugenides
The Virgin Suicides (film), a 1999 film by Sofia Coppola, based on the novel
The Virgin Soldiers, a novel by Leslie Thomas
The Virgin Soldiers (film), a 1969 film by John Dexter, based on the novel
The Virgin Spring, a 1960 film by Ingmar Bergman
"The Virgin", a song by Gene Clark from his 1971 album White Light

Places 

The Virgin Islands, including:
The British Virgin Islands
The United States Virgin Islands
The Spanish Virgin Islands
The Virgin (Purcell Mountains), a mountain in Canada

Other uses 

 La Pucelle (violin), also known as The Virgin, a 1709 violin made by Antonio Stradivari